Denys Tourtchenkov (born 7 October 1978 in Volgograd, Soviet Union) is a Russian sprint canoeist who competed in the early 2000s. He won a complete set of medals at the 2001 ICF Canoe Sprint World Championships in Poznań with a gold (K-4 500 m), a silver (K-4 200), and a bronze (K-4 1000 m).

References

 Denis Tourtchenkov at infosport.ru

1978 births
Living people
Russian male canoeists
ICF Canoe Sprint World Championships medalists in kayak
Sportspeople from Volgograd